The 2013 Internazionali Femminili di Palermo was a professional women's tennis tournament played on outdoor clay courts. It was the 26th edition of the tournament which was part of the 2013 WTA Tour. It took place in Palermo, Italy between 8 and 14 July 2013.

Singles main draw entrants

Seeds 

 1 Rankings are as of June 24, 2013

Other entrants 
The following players received wildcards into the singles main draw:
  Corinna Dentoni 
  Sara Errani
  Alice Matteucci

The following players received entry from the qualifying draw:
  Kristina Barrois
  Alexandra Dulgheru
  Giulia Gatto-Monticone
  Maria João Koehler

Withdrawals
Before the tournament
  Alexa Glatch
  Tatjana Maria
  Paula Ormaechea
  Yaroslava Shvedova

Retirements
  Alexandra Dulgheru (right toe injury)
  Mirjana Lučić-Baroni (gastrointestinal illness)

Doubles main draw entrants

Seeds 

 1 Rankings are as of June 24, 2013

Other entrants 
The following pairs received wildcards into the doubles main draw:
  Corinna Dentoni /  Anastasia Grymalska
  Karin Knapp /  Flavia Pennetta

Champions

Singles 

  Roberta Vinci def.  Sara Errani, 6–3, 3–6, 6–3

Doubles 

  Kristina Mladenovic /  Katarzyna Piter def.  Karolína Plíšková /  Kristýna Plíšková, 6–1, 5–7, [10–8]

References

External links 
 Official website

Internazionali Femminili di Palermo
Internazionali Femminili di Palermo
2013 in Italian women's sport
Torneo